Jason Harries (born 14 February 1989) is a Welsh professional rugby union player who plays for Cardiff Rugby as a wing or centre. He was a Wales under-20 and Wales Sevens international.

Harries joined Cardiff in 2018 having previously played for the London Scottish and Edinburgh since returning to the 15-a-side game in 2015.

References

External links 
itsrugby.co.uk profile

Welsh rugby union players
Cardiff Rugby players
Living people
1989 births
London Scottish F.C. players
Edinburgh Rugby players
Rugby union wings
Rugby union centres